Bad Blood is a top-view, post-apocalyptic action role-playing game from 1990.

Story
A nuclear war has turned the world into a wasteland. The pure-blooded humans have retreated in large cities while mutants live in small villages on the plains where they make a living by hunting the many monsters. Now one of the human leaders, Lord Dominix, wants to start a war to wipe out all the "bad-blooded" mutants. Your village chief has assigned you with the task of preventing this war.

Gameplay
Bad Blood is a top-down action-adventure. You can not create your own character but have to pick one of the three predefined ones: Varrigg (a strong green mutant who fights with his bare hands), Dekker (a human male armed with a knife) or Jakka (who looks human but fires laser beams from her eyes). The choice you make has only a limited impact on gameplay and storyline.

Gameplay consists of exploring the world map, visiting several cities and villages, talking with NPCs, picking up items and new weapons (shotguns, grenades, Uzis, etc.) and much real-time combat. The game has a day-night cycle which influences the amount of monsters on the plains and whether or not you can talk with some NPCs.

Reception
Charles Ardai reviewed the game for Computer Gaming World, and stated that "Bad Blood is nothing if not well-intended, but it fails for want of a spark of innovation, either in the story or the gameplay."

Reviews
White Wolf #22 (Aug./Sept., 1990)
ASM (Aktueller Software Markt) (Sep, 1990)
ACE (Advanced Computer Entertainment) (Aug, 1990)
The Games Machine (Aug, 1990)
Joker Verlag präsentiert: Sonderheft (1992)

References

External links
 
 

1990 video games
Action role-playing video games
Commodore 64 games
DOS games
Post-apocalyptic video games
Role-playing video games
Top-down video games
Video games scored by Jeroen Tel

Video games produced by Warren Spector